Ruggero Grava (26 April 1922 – 4 May 1949) was an Italian born French football striker.

He moved to France at the age of 1. He began his playing career with Amiens AC and played for EF Nancy-Lorraine, EF Bordeaux-Guyenne, FC Girondins de Bordeaux and CO Roubaix-Tourcoing in France. In 1948, he moved to Torino F.C., with another Frenchman of Italian descent, Émile Bongiorni of RC Paris. They both died in the Superga air disaster on 4 May 1949.

Honours

Club
Roubaix-Tourcoing
Ligue 1: 1946–47
Torino
Serie A: 1948–49

References
 A tribute to Roger Grava

1922 births
1949 deaths
People from the Province of Pordenone
French footballers
Italian footballers
Italian emigrants to France
Association football forwards
FC Girondins de Bordeaux players
Ligue 1 players
Torino F.C. players
Serie A players
CO Roubaix-Tourcoing players
EF Nancy-Lorraine players
EF Bordeaux-Guyenne players
Footballers from Friuli Venezia Giulia
Footballers killed in the Superga air disaster